Tom Ledger (born 17 March 1992) is an Australian rules footballer who played for the St Kilda Football Club in the Australian Football League (AFL) and Claremont in the West Australian Football League (WAFL). Nephew of actor Heath Ledger.

Ledger made his first appearance at the senior level in the 2011 AFL season in Round 11, against .

At the end of the 2013 season, Ledger requested to be delisted by St Kilda, in the hope of being recruited by another club.  However he was overlooked by all other AFL clubs and returned to play for Claremont in the WAFL.

Ledger studied law during his time at St Kilda.

References

External links

1992 births
Living people
St Kilda Football Club players
Claremont Football Club players
Sandringham Football Club players
Australian rules footballers from Western Australia